The Sussex Border Path is a long-distance footpath around the borders of Sussex, a historic county and former medieval kingdom in southern England. There is also an additional  spur known as the Mid Sussex Link, which links East Grinstead with Fishersgate and Mile Oak on the western boundary of the city of Brighton and Hove.

The Sussex Border Path is not a National Trail, but when the England Coast Path National Trail is completed, its Sussex stretch will in combination with the Border Path make a route allowing a complete walk around the county.

History
The path was first devised and published in 1983 by Ben Perkins and Aeneas Macintosh. The footpath uses existing rights of way to follow the Sussex county border and is waymarked. It is managed by volunteer teams from the Sussex area of the Ramblers. The path is waymarked with signs showing a martlet, the heraldic bird found on the Sussex flag and heraldic shield.

Sussex's external boundaries probably crystallised around the 6th and 7th centuries. To the west, Bede describes the boundary with the Kingdom of Wessex as being opposite the Isle of Wight, and which later fell on the River Ems. To the east at Romney Marsh and the River Limen (now called the River Rother or Kent Ditch), Sussex shared a border with the Kingdom of Kent. North of the Forest Ridge in the Wealden forest lay the sub-kingdom of Surrey, which became a frontier area disputed by various kingdoms until it later became part of Wessex.

In 1974 the area of Sussex was divided into two ceremonial counties, East and West Sussex, and Sussex continues to formally exist as a historic county. The Mid Sussex Link follows the boundary between the current ceremonial counties of East and West Sussex.

Route
The Sussex Border Path begins at Thorney Island, now effectively a peninsula that juts into Chichester Harbour. The path forms a  circuit around the island; it then extends across the South Coast Plain to Emsworth on the Hampshire side of the River Ems, the river which forms the Sussex-Hampshire border at this location. The path continues over the chalk ridge of the South Downs and onto the Greensand Ridge of the western Weald.

From Blackdown, the path continues into the Low Weald to Gatwick Airport and into the High Weald to the town of East Grinstead. From here the path descends to the Romney marshes to end in the historic town of Rye.

The Mid Sussex Link begins at East Grinstead and passes through Sharpthorne and Scaynes Hill to Ditchling, then over the South Downs to Fishersgate, between Southwick and Portslade.

Image gallery

See also
 South Downs Way
 The Four Men: a Farrago

References

External links

 The Sussex Border Path Long Distance Walking Route
 The Sussex Border Path, Long Distance Walkers Association

Long-distance footpaths in England
Footpaths in East Sussex
Footpaths in West Sussex
County-themed walking routes in the United Kingdom